Tanjil Bren is a small town in Victoria, Australia, on Mount Baw Baw Tourist Road,  west of Mount Baw Baw in the Shire of Baw Baw. It was established during the Victorian Gold Rush. Four accommodation lodges, Mooshead, Reindeer, Jenny's and Timbertop Lodge, are located in Tanjil Bren.

Tanjil Bren Post Office opened on 1 November 1939 and closed in 1971.

Climate

Tanjil Bren has a cool rainforest climate, with especially high springtime rainfall. Heavy snowfalls are a frequent occurrence.

References

External links

Towns in Victoria (Australia)
Shire of Baw Baw